The Republic of Bulgaria is a country in Southeast Europe, and a member of both NATO (since 2004) and the European Union (since 2007). It maintains diplomatic relations with 181 countries.

Bulgaria has generally good foreign relations with its neighbors and has proved to be a constructive force in the region  under socialist and democratic governments alike. Promoting regional stability, Bulgaria hosted a Southeast European Foreign Ministers meeting in July 1996, and an OSCE conference on Black Sea cooperation in November 1995.  Bulgaria also participated in the 1996 South Balkan Defense Ministerial in Albania and it is active in the Southeast European Cooperative Initiative. Since the group's inception in 2015 Bulgaria has been a part of the B9 format, a subset of Eastern European NATO countries.

Bulgaria's main allies are Greece and Romania, and it maintains good relations with Serbia and the rest of the Balkans. The Republic of North Macedonia plays an important role in Bulgarian foreign and domestic policy due to historical, ethnic and cultural ties.

History 
After the fall of communism in Eastern Europe in 1989, Bulgaria sought economic cooperative arrangements with Germany, Italy, France, Portugal, and Spain, as well as military cooperation with Romania, Greece, and Turkey. A start was made on easing tensions with its historical adversary Serbia.

Due to close historical, cultural, and economic ties, Bulgaria sought a mutually beneficial relationship with Russia, on which it largely depends for energy supplies.

Bulgaria's EU Association Agreement came into effect in 1994, and Bulgaria formally applied for full EU membership in December 1995.  During the 1999 EU summit in Helsinki, the country was invited to start membership talks with the Union.  On January 1, 2007, Bulgaria officially became a member of the European Union.  In 1996, Bulgaria acceded to the Wassenaar Arrangement controlling exports of weapons and sensitive technology to countries of concern and also was admitted to the World Trade Organization.  Bulgaria is a member of the Zangger Committee and the Nuclear Suppliers Group.  After a period of equivocation under a socialist government, in March 1997 a UDF-led caretaker cabinet applied for full NATO membership, which became a reality in April 2004.

Bulgaria and the United States signed a Defense Cooperation Agreement in 2006 providing for military bases and training camps of the U.S. Army in Bulgaria, as part of the Pentagon's restructuring plan.

The HIV trial in Libya resulted in the release of Bulgarian nurses imprisoned by Muammar Gaddafi's government in Libya. French President Nicolas Sarkozy secured the release in exchange for several business deals.

In June 2010, media reports claimed that Bulgaria considers closing a total of 30 of its diplomatic missions abroad. Currently, Bulgaria has 83 embassies, 6 permanent representations, 20 consular offices, and 2 diplomatic bureaus. The proposed closures were backed by Prime Minister Boyko Borisov, who described some of Bulgaria's embassies as useless. In November 2010, Bulgaria's Foreign Minister Nikolay Mladenov formally announced his team proposes to close seven embassies as part of a plan for restructuring and austerity measures. Thus, in 2011, Bulgaria will most likely shut down its diplomatic missions in Sudan, Angola, Zimbabwe, Cambodia, Thailand, Mexico, and Tunisia. The choice is based on a scrutinizing financial analysis and on the necessity to optimize the diplomatic corps, the Ministry says. The staff of the Bulgarian diplomatic corps will be reduced by 15 people in total.

In March 2012 the Borisov administration decided to discontinue its plans to build with the help of Rosatom and Atomstroyexport the Belene nuclear station near the River Danube. At the time, Bulgaria depended on Russia for 89% of its petrol, 100% of natural gas and all of the nuclear fuel needed for its twin-reactor Kozloduy nuclear station. In the sequential lawsuit, the International Court of Arbitration at the International Chamber of Commerce in Geneva ruled against Bulgaria.

In August 2014 Bulgaria suspended its 930 km portion of the South Stream natural gas pipeline project with Gazprom until the project conforms to European Union law. In default of this project, Naftogaz and Ukraine stood to benefit. Gas was to be pumped to the Black Sea port of Varna before it travelled overland to the Serbian border and northeast from there to Hungary, Slovenia and Austria.

A Bulgarian weapons dealer named Emilian Gebrev was poisoned (along with his son and an employee) in Sofia in spring 2015 using a substance believed to be the nerve agent Novichok, and in 2020 three Russian nationals were charged in absentia. One of the three went by the name Sergei Fedotov, which is the alias of Denis Sergeev (GRU officer).

The Bucharest Nine (or B9 format) is an organization founded on 4 November 2015 in Bucharest, Romania, at the initiative of the President of Romania Klaus Iohannis and the President of Poland Andrzej Duda during a bilateral meeting between them. Its members are Bulgaria, the Czech Republic, Estonia, Hungary, Latvia, Lithuania, Poland, Romania and Slovakia. Its apparition was mainly a result of a perceived aggressive attitude from Russia following the annexation of Crimea from Ukraine and its posterior intervention in eastern Ukraine both in 2014. All members of the B9 were either part of the former Soviet Union (USSR) or the Soviet-led Warsaw Pact.

Rampant corruption has led as recently as June 2019 to repeated rejection of Bulgaria's attempts to join the Schengen Area.

After the Prespa Agreement between Macedonia and Greece went into force in 2018, Bulgaria broke the Friendship Agreement in which it would assist Macedonia with its EU integration, and instead vetoed the start of Macedonia's EU accession talks. Bulgaria now places demands, which some Macedonian observers label "outrageous", on Macedonia in which Macedonians must ‘admit’ their grandparents were Bulgarians and their language is in fact Bulgarian if they wish to continue their path into the EU.

Bulgaria manufactures many types of Soviet-era ammunition, anti-tank missiles, and light arms, and has extensive trade ties with other recovering Soviet countries for this reason.

The TurkStream natural gas pipeline project seemed to excite quite a few journalists. The project's European landfall is Bulgaria. TurkStream started shipping gas to Bulgaria, Greece and North Macedonia on 1 January 2020, after the personal intervention of Vladimir Putin. One journalist ran his article under the headline "How Bulgaria gave Gazprom the keys to the Balkans".

In 2020, five Russian diplomats and the Russian military attaché were expelled on grounds that they were engaging in espionage. Together with the two expelled on account of the Iliev scandal, eight Russian diplomats were expelled over 18 months to April 2021.

Prime Minister Kiril Petkov has introduced a political taboo on the use of Russian narratives, including the "special operation" label favoured by Vladimir Putin. Those who think otherwise so have to bear heavy political responsibility: the Bulgarian Minister of Defense, Stefan Yanev, was the first to be punished. He allowed himself to declare, following Putin, that it is not "war" in Ukraine but a "military operation". Petkov dismissed the minister on March 1, a scant week after the start of the Russian invasion of Ukraine.

Petkov recalled his ambassador to Russia, after Russian ambassador to Bulgaria Eleonora Mitrofanova conducted herself abysmally in the wake of the Russian invasion of Ukraine.

On 7 May 2022 the head of Bulgargaz, Ivan Topchiisky, announced that Bulgaria will be able to overcome its dependence on the Russian supplier Gazprom by the end of 2022. The demands of Gazprom to make payments for gas in rubles added fuel to the fire, and Sofia refused. Thus, Bulgaria turned out to be one of the two EU countries to which Russia cut off gas supplies, and this necessitated the urgent co-operation of EU Commissioner Ursula von der Leyen.

In early 2022, Petkov was sympathetic to Volodymyr Zelensky's repeated requests for military aid during his country's battle against the Russians but he faced the refusal of his coalition partner the Bulgarian Socialist Party (which is the successor to the Soviet-era Bulgarian Communist Party) and their leader Korneliya Ninova. On 4 May, Parliament approved the continuation of repairs to damaged Ukrainian military equipment, and will continue to support Ukraine's membership in the EU, as well as to the Ukrainian refugees from the war, who numbered more than 56,000 as of 7 June. Petkov noted Bulgaria's espousal of all sanctions against Russia, and would allow the use of the Port of Varna to transship goods that had been stifled by the Russian Blockade of Odessa.

Bulgaria-NATO relations
Bulgaria joined NATO in 2004, three years before it acceded to the European Union.

In June 2016 Borisov and Plevneliev vetoed Romania's idea of forming a NATO flotilla in the Black Sea, one day after a stern warning from Russia. NATO partners Romania and Turkey had favoured the idea, along with Ukraine, which wanted to join any such initiative. The refusal came on the day of a visit of President Ioannis of Romania.

In 2018, Bulgaria ordered eight F-16 machines, to replace its aging fleet of Mig 29s. Together with service and training, they will cost $1.2 billion. The fleet of Mig 29s are serviced by their Russian manufacturer.

In December 2020  German manufacturer Lurssen was contracted to equip the Bulgarian Navy with new Multipurpose Modular Patrol Vessels (aka Offshore Patrol Vessels) built at the Bulgarian shipyard MTG Dolphin JSC. Lürssen is the prime contractor for the Bulgarian Ministry of Defence, while Swedish manufacturer Saab AB subcontracted to provide the electronics. The contract was valued at $593 million. The vessels are 90 meters long and displace 2,300 tons.

In December 2020 one Russian military attaché in Sofia was alleged to have gathered information on US service members stationed on Bulgarian territory during military exercises.

In 2021 six USAF F-16s operated from Bulgaria's Graf Ignatievo Air Base.

On 18 March 18 Bulgaria and Romania amended their 2011 Agreement on cross-border air policing.

In March 2021 six Bulgarians were charged with espionage and several Russian diplomats were expelled. The Bulgarian ring leader was a highly placed former official with the Ministry of Defense named Ivan Iliev, who corrupted his wife, and who trained military intelligence officers. Two Russian diplomats named Sergei Nikolashin and Vadim Bikov were expelled on 22 March 2021. Iliev was finally apprehended outside the Russian embassy, where he had intended to obtain asylum. Another arrest was that of Lyubomir Medarov who had until then been in charge of the office of classified communications and information of the Bulgarian parliament. Colonel Petar Petrov from the Ministry of Defense had access to the most highly classified documents about NATO activities. One observer characterized this event as the biggest story in Bulgarian defence since World War Two. Prosecutors alleged that the group "posed a serious threat to national security by collecting and handing to a foreign country state secrets of Bulgaria, NATO and the European Union." At the time of the arrests, several held senior positions in the Military Intelligence Service and the Ministry of Defence.

Diplomatic relations 

Bulgaria has not established diplomatic relations with Bhutan, Gambia, Haiti, Kiribati, Marshall Islands, Papua New Guinea, Saint Kitts and Nevis, Samoa, South Sudan, and Tonga.

Relations by region and country

Africa

Americas

Asia

Europe

Oceania

See also 
 List of diplomatic missions in Bulgaria
 List of diplomatic missions of Bulgaria
 List of joint US-Bulgarian military bases

References

External links 
 Bulgarian Ministry of Foreign Affairs